Charles Claxton may refer to:

 Charles Claxton (basketball) (born 1970), retired American basketball player
 Charles Claxton (bishop) (1903–1992), English bishop